Grant Robert Murray (born 29 August 1975 in Edinburgh) is a Scottish former professional football player. Murray is currently the assistant manager at Queen of the South.  

His versatility saw him play in several positions during his career, such as a defensive midfielder and at fullback, although he was primarily considered to be a centre-back.

Playing career
Murray started his career with Hearts, playing for their first team in six seasons. He was an unused substitute as Hearts beat Rangers 2–1 in the 1998 Scottish Cup Final. Murray moved to St Johnstone in 2001, but they were relegated from the Scottish Premier League (SPL) in 2002. He then signed for Partick Thistle in 2003, but they were relegated from the SPL in 2004 and the First Division in 2005. Murray signed for Kilmarnock in 2006, where he linked up again with Jim Jefferies, who had been his manager at Hearts. He agreed a new two-year contract with Kilmarnock in April 2007.

Murray was released by Kilmarnock after the 2008–09 Scottish Premier League season. He signed for First Division club Raith Rovers later in the 2009 close season and scored his first goal for Raith Rovers on 29 August 2009, a stunning 30-yard volley against Dunfermline Athletic in a Fife derby at East End Park.

Coaching career
Murray moved into coaching while playing for Raith Rovers, earning UEFA qualifications. On 3 July 2012, Murray was appointed their player-manager. Murray signed an extended contract with Raith Rovers in December 2013. He guided Raith Rovers to victory in the 2013–14 Scottish Challenge Cup, winning in the final against Rangers at Easter Road. It was his first trophy as a manager and Raith's first cup win since the 1994–95 Scottish League Cup. Murray was sacked by Raith in April 2015, after a run of five successive defeats.

As of October 2015, Murray was coaching Hibernian academy players. Murray guided the Hibernian Under-20's team to double success in the 2017-18 season, winning the SPFL Development League and the Scottish Youth Cup.

In March 2021, Murray was appointed assistant manager to Gary Naysmith at Scottish League Two club, Edinburgh City. 

In June 2021, Murray was appointed assistant manager to Laurie Ellis at Scottish League One club Queen's Park.  On 31 December 2021, Ellis and Murray departed the Spiders. 

On 19 February 2022, Queens interim player-manager Willie Gibson, had Murray as his assistant manager, as Queen of the South earned a 0–0 draw at Palmerston versus Arbroath, league leaders in the Scottish Championship.  On 21 February 2022, Gibson and Murray were announced as the Doonhamers management team until the end of the 2021-22 season.
On 4 May 2022, Gibson and Murray were appointed Queens management team until the end of the 2022–23 season. 

On 21 December 2022, after Gibson departed the Dumfries club by mutual consent, Murray was placed in interim charge of the Doonhamers. 

On 10 January 2023, Marvin Bartley announced after Queens Quarter Final win over Kelty Hearts in the SPFL Trust Trophy that Murray would be remaining as the Doonhamers assistant manager, having worked with him previously at Hibernian.

Managerial statistics
As of 7 January 2023

Honours

Player
Heart Of Midlothian
Scottish Cup (1): 1997-98

Manager

Raith Rovers
 Scottish Challenge Cup (1): 2013–14

References

External links

  Profile at londonhearts.com

1975 births
Association football defenders
Heart of Midlothian F.C. players
Kilmarnock F.C. players
Living people
Partick Thistle F.C. players
Raith Rovers F.C. managers
Raith Rovers F.C. players
Scottish Professional Football League managers
Scottish Football League managers
Scottish Football League players
Scottish football managers
Scottish footballers
Scottish Premier League players
Footballers from Edinburgh
St Johnstone F.C. players
Hibernian F.C. non-playing staff